Emamzadeh Ebrahim (also Romanized as Emāmzādeh Ebrāhīm) is a village in Chubar Rural District, Ahmadsargurab District, Shaft County, Gilan Province, Iran. At the 2006 census, its population was 310, in 94 families.

References 

Populated places in Shaft County